The demographics of the Middle East and  North Africa (MENA) region show a highly populated, culturally diverse region spanning three continents. As of 2018, the population was nearly 578 million. The class, cultural, ethnic, governmental, linguistic and religious make-up of the region is highly variable.

Debates on which countries should be included in the Middle East are wide-ranging. The Greater Middle East and North Africa region can include the Caucasus, Cyprus, Afghanistan, and several sub-Saharan African states due to various social, religious and historic ties. The most commonly accepted countries in the MENA region are included on this page.

According to the US White House's "Review of Standards for Maintaining, Collecting, and Presenting Federal Data on Race and Ethnicity," several of people debate with what should be included in the definition as MENA . The debate states that the League of Arab States, Turkish, Persians, Iranian, Jews, Israelis, Afghans, Azerbaijanis, Ethiopian, Portuguese, Georgians, Greeks, Italians, Somalis, Spaniards, Sudanese; Assyrians, Chaldeans, Coptics, and Armenians should be allowed to self-identify as MENA. Additionally, this reports states that the World Bank’s classification of MENA should be used to define this diverse yet connected population.

Population by country 

The most populous country in the MENA region is Egypt with nearly 100 million people, accounting for approximately 17% of the total. The least populous country is Djibouti with a population of almost 0.9 million, accounting for about 0.15% of the total. The largest country in land area is Algeria at 2,381,740 km2. The smallest country in land area is the Gaza Strip at 360 km2. The average population density for the MENA region is about 39 people per square kilometer. The highest population density is in the Gaza Strip, with about 5,102 people per square kilometer. The lowest population density is in Mauritania, with 3.73 people per square kilometer.

Population shifts 
The MENA region's population is growing at an average rate of 1.56%. This is well above the global rate of 1.1% population growth. High rates of migration, high birth rates, higher life expectancy and lower infant mortality rates contribute to higher populations.

Migration 
Migration rates to, from and between the MENA region are high. On average there are 1.5 migrants per 1000 in the population. This accounts for net immigration and emigration rates. The highest net immigration is in Bahrain with 11.6 immigrants per 1000 of the population. The highest net emigration is in Lebanon with 40.3 emigrants per 1000 of the population. In other words, more people are leaving Lebanon than are coming in. Migration in the Middle East has been shaped by various events and phenomena including, but not limited to, the following:

 The Israel-Palestine conflict
 The Syrian Civil War
 The Iraq War
 The Algerian Civil War (See Algerians in France)
 Post-colonial relationships
 Job prospects in oil rich states
 Political repression
 Human rights violations

Most MENA migrants go to Europe (See Immigration to Europe) or to other MENA states. There are also large populations from sub-Saharan Africa in North Africa and from South and Southeast Asia in Persian Gulf region.

Youth 
The MENA region is characterized with a young average population age. The median age across the MENA region is 26.8 years old. The younger generation is growing, creating an age bulge and high rates of youth unemployment. This has also led to a brain drain, involving young and educated people leaving their home country for better job prospects in other countries.

Most populous areas 
The Middle East and North Africa have an average annual growth rate of 1.56% and has one of the world's most rapidly expanding populations. Urban areas have been at the center of this growth, as the urban share of the total population in the region grew from 48% in the 1980s and 60% in 2000. In 2015 it was expected to exceed 70% whereas the average growth of developing countries in 2015 was 54%. The only region which exceeds MENA's average annual growth of 4% in sub-Saharan Africa which is not as urbanized as MENA. The regions average growth per capita was 0,9% between 1980 and 2000. The growth in the region did become better after 2000 mainly because of the rise in oil prices. The growth in the MENA region did not happen under ideal circumstances, but instead it occurred during economic decline and struggle. Poverty and vulnerability are also affecting the growing urban population and in the 1990s, 20 million people were living with an income under US$2/day. This happened during a period of rapid growth but did not see any reduction in the regions poverty levels.

Economy 
Middle Eastern and North African economy are highly dependent and centralized around natural resources within the country. Countries in the region face different challenges depending on the commodity they have. The categorization cannot explain all the different challenges the countries face but is highly useful to categorize countries based on similar challenges.

The three categories are: Firstly, countries with a high population and low natural resources (RPLA countries), secondly, countries with a high population and high oil wealth (RRLA countries) and thirdly, countries with a high indigenous population and high oil deposits (RRLP countries). This categorization cannot be used to explain every social and political challenge faced in the region, instead, these similar challenges and constraints are used to classified the countries. Furthermore, this categorization can be used to understand development within the region. A more detailed classification of each country, their GDP, GDP per capita and oil rent can be found in the GDP table.

As can be seen on the world map the Middle East and North Africa have large reserves of gas and other natural resources.

Education 
The Middle East and North Africa have strongly developed their education in terms of the average level of schooling, which has quadrupled since the 1960s. They have also halved the illiteracy rate in the region since the 1980s and achieved complete gender parity in primary school. Literacy in the region for adults has improved from 59% in the 1990s to 78% in 2010.

The access and enrollment in the school system have also increased in the region and all boys and girls have had access to primary education in most of the countries in the region. Enrollment in schools has increased from 86% to 94% between 2000 and 2010. It is interesting to note that the region, differently from the rest of the world, has had a reversed gender gap meaning that girls are outperforming boys in 4th-grade math and this is systematic up until the 8th grade.

Even though the region and the countries are highly invested in developing the school system and education by investing 5,3% of the GDP in the education the quality is still low and lacking and needs to be improved (can be seen on the table). There is also a difference in education and a large gap between the rich and the poor. Furthermore, the political instability in the region and the conflicts are forcing children to drop out of school. Still, school dropouts have significantly decreased in the region.

Languages 
The five major languages in the Middle East and North Africa are: Arabic, Hebrew, Persian, Turkish and Kurdish. There are approximately 571 million speakers of the five languages including individuals speaking the language outside of the Middle East and North Africa.

Arabic is spoken in the following countries: Algeria, Bahrain, Djibouti, Egypt, Gaza, Iraq, Israel, Jordan, Kuwait, Lebanon, Libya, Mauritania, Morocco, Oman, Qatar, Saudi Arabia, Sudan, Syria, Tunisia, United Arab Emirates, West Bank and Yemen.

Hebrew is spoken in Israel.

Persian is spoken in Iran.

Turkish is spoken in Turkey.

Kurdish is spoken in parts of Turkey, Syria, Iraq and Iran.

Religion 
The MENA region is home to the three main monotheistic religions: Judaism, Christianity, and Islam. Diversity in a single religion and sectarian splits have contributed to various group identities and minorities. Approximately 325 million Muslims live in the MENA region, which constitutes 20% of the global Muslim population. However, it also has the highest percentage of Muslim-majority countries. By 2010 it was estimated that 93% of the populations in the Middle East and North Africa were Muslim, although this information can vary from the availability of the sources each country provides. Even with a majority Muslim population, diverse states in the region do not proclaim Islam as the official religion. The Islamic Republic of Iran, the Islamic Republic of Afghanistan and the Islamic Republic of Pakistan, are the only countries that include religion in their formal titles.

The main division within Islam is between the Sunni and Shia sects. 80% of Muslims in the MENA region are Sunnis, being the majority group, however, their practices and interpretations of religious mandates can differ from country to country. Between 36 million and 44 million Shi’as live in the Arab region. Of the Shi'a sects, the most prominent group is the Twelvers. Minority groups are the Ismailis, Zaidis, Alevis and Alawites. Iran is home of 70 million Shi'as, which constitutes 40% of the world's total Shi’a population. Iraq counts with 12% of Shi’a worldwide population; other countries with 1 million or more of the Shi’a population are Turkey, Syria, Yemen, Saudi Arabia, and Lebanon. Groups such as the Druze and Kharijites are difficult to classify as strictly Sunni or Shi’a. Another main commonality in both Sunni and Shi’i groups is Sufism. Sufi practices have reached other African and Asian countries.

Israel is home of 5.8 million Jews. However, the Jewish population has decreased significantly in Egypt, Iraq, Morocco, Tunisia, Libya, and Syria. In Turkey and Iran, Jewish communities reach around twenty thousand each, but without significant influence. Christians groups such as the Orthodox, Roman Catholic and Protestants are spread throughout the region. In Egypt, Copts are the major Christian group and represent between 8-10% of the national population. Syria has a similar percentage of Christians. In Lebanon, the Maronite Christian make up 21% of the population. In Bahrain, Jordan, Libya, Oman, and Yemen, other minority religious groups that can be found are Hindus and Buddhists.

From 2010 to 2050, the Muslim population in the MENA countries is expected to grow 74%, from 317 million to 552 million. Muslims will remain the majority group in the region, while Christians and Jews will remain as the second and third largest groups respectively. Buddhists and Hindus are expected to double their size by 2050.

Fertility rates in the MENA region are always high. This differs among religious groups. Between 2010 and 2015 the fertility rate of Muslim women was 3 children per woman, followed by Jewish women with a rate of 2.8. In the case of the Christian women, their rate is lower than Muslims however there is no conclusive and specific data across the region. Overall, youth constitutes the largest population of the countries in the region. In 2010, the most prominent age range found was between 15 and 59 for the three main religious groups. For Muslims the median age is 23 years old, representing the youngest religious groups. By contrast, the median age for the Jewish population is 32, being the oldest religious group. Based on these projections, equal access to quality education and an increase in the number of job seekers are part of the challenges the governments currently face. The wealthy Gulf Cooperation Countries ( GCC): Bahrain, Kuwait, Oman, Qatar, Saudi Arabia, and the United Arab Emirates, tend to have higher access to literacy rates than lower-income countries, such as Egypt, Iraq, and Morocco. Concerning labor migration flows, the Gulf Cooperation Countries are expected to increase the number of foreign workers from India, Egypt, Pakistan, Bangladesh, the Philippines, and Sri Lanka. Due to these flows, by 2050 is expected the population of Hindus and Buddhist will be doubled. Christians are also expected to increase, while Muslims and Jewish populations are expected to remain without significant changes.

The following map shows the percentage of the population in each area which is Islamic.

Ethnic composition 

The MENA region is highly diverse and is home to many different ethnic and identity groups. Five of the largest ethnic groups in the region;  Arabs, Azerbaijanis, Kurds,  Persians and Turks.

Other groups include: Arameans, Armenians, Assyrians, Balochs, Berbers, Copts, Druze, Georgians, Gilaks, Greeks, Jews,  Kawliya, Lurs, Mandeans, Mazanderanis, Mhallami, Nawar, Samaritans, Shabaks, Talishis, Tats,  Turcomans, Yazidis, and Zazas.

Human Development Index 
The Human Development Index is a statistical indicator to obtain the average of human development in each country created by the United Nations Development Program (UNDP). Three main dimensions are measured: Health, education, and standard of living. These dimensions are valued based on life expectancy at birth, schooling years and gross national income per capita.  The 2018 Human Development Index of the Middle East and North Africa region countries range from Low to Very High category. The MENA region includes the richest oil countries in the world and the poorest such as Yemen and Djibouti. The last places of HDI in the MENA region are Sudan, Djibouti, and Yemen. Data about Palestine is not included in the HDI ranking. The table below shows the MENA countries according to their Human Development Index scores in 2018:

Israel and the Persian Gulf countries are the highest countries ranked in the region, classified as Very High Human Development. The three main countries with a notorious sudden decline in the HDI ranking were Syria, Libya, and Yemen. The ongoing conflicts and violence had caused them to fall an average of 24 places in the worldwide ranking. Lebanon, not involved directly in a violent conflict, has been affected by the increasing waves of refugees coming from Syria. Compared to other regions, the Middle East has a higher income per capita than Latin America and sub-Saharan Africa, but it does not exceed East Asia or South Asia. Concerning the literacy rates, the Middle East is far behind Latin America and East Asia, and it is positioned ahead of Sub-Saharan Africa and South Asia. Other features not included in the HDI report to take into account for measuring development in the MENA region are the political regimes, national and international economic policies, accountability and the consequences of internal and regional conflicts.

See also 
Demographics of the Arab League
Demographics of the Middle East
Genetic history of the Middle East
Genetic history of North Africa
Demographics of MENA countries

Algeria
Bahrain
Djibouti
Egypt
Gaza
Iran
Iraq
Palestine
Jordan
Kuwait
Lebanon
Libya
Mauritania
Morocco
Oman
Qatar
Saudi Arabia
Sudan
Syria
Tunisia
Turkey
United Arab Emirates
Yemen

References 

Middle East and North Africa
Middle East
North Africa